Park Hae-ja (born 23 May 1956) is a South Korean politician and a former professor of administration at Honam University currently serving as the 10th - and the first woman - President of KERIS, Korea Education & Research Information Service.

From 1989 Park had been teaching administration at Honam University for over two decades and also served as Dean of its School of Humanities & Social Science. Park also worked at South Jeolla Provincial government as its head of Women and Welfare Bureau for 4 years which was unusual for non-state exam takers to have their tenure extended.

After serving 4 years at the National Assembly from Gwangju from 2012 to 2016, Park failed to earn her party's nomination twice for her re-election - in 2016 general election and 2018 bi-election.

In 2017 she worked for President Moon Jae-in as a spokesperson of his presidential campaign.

In 2021 Park resigned from the KERIS reportedly to run for the next Education Superintendent for Gwangju.

Park holds four degrees - a bachelor and a master's in politics from Ewha Womans University, a Master of Science from University of Oregon and a doctorate in administration from University of Seoul.

Electoral history

References 

1956 births
Ewha Womans University alumni
Living people
Members of the National Assembly (South Korea)
People from Boseong County
Academic staff of Honam University
South Korean government officials
South Korean women academics
University of Oregon alumni
University of Seoul alumni
Female members of the National Assembly (South Korea)